Kilij Arslan II or ʿIzz ad-Dīn Kilij Arslān ibn Masʿūd (Modern Turkish Kılıç Arslan, meaning "Sword Lion") was a Seljuk Sultan of Rûm from 1156 until his death in 1192.

Reign
In 1159, Kilij Arslan attacked Byzantine emperor Manuel I Comnenus as he marched past Iconium (Konya, capital of Rüm), as Manuel returned from negotiating with Nur ad-Din Zengi in Syria. In 1161, Manuel's nephew John Contostephanus defeated Kilij Arslan, and the sultan travelled to Constantinople in a show of submission. 

As Arnold of Lübeck reports in his Chronica Slavorum, he was present at the meeting of Henry the Lion with Kilij-Arslan during the former's pilgrimage to Jerusalem in 1172. When they met near Tarsus, the sultan embraced and kissed the German duke, reminding him that they were blood cousins ('amplexans et deosculans eum, dicens, eum consanguineum suum esse'). When the duke asked for details of this relationship, Kilij Arslan informed him that 'a noble lady from the land of Germans married a king of Russia who had a daughter by her; this daughter's daughter arrived to our land, and I descend from her.'

In 1173, Kilij Arslan, now at peace with the Byzantines, allied with Nur ad-Din against Mosul. The peace treaty with the Byzantines lasted until 1175, when Kilij Arslan refused to hand over to Manuel the territory conquered from the Danishmends, although both sides had for some time been building up their fortifications and armies in preparation for a renewed war. Kilij Arslan tried to negotiate, but Manuel invaded the sultanate in 1176, intending to capture Iconium itself. Kilij Arslan was able to defeat Emperor Manuel I Komnenos's army at the Battle of Myriokephalon, the Sultan forced the emperor to negotiate a fragile peace.

In 1179, Kilij Arslan captured and held to ransom Henry I, the renowned count of Champagne, who was returning overland from a visit to Jerusalem. The ransom was paid by the Byzantine Emperor and Henry was released, but died soon afterwards.

In 1180, the sultan took advantage of the instability in the Byzantine Empire after Manuel's death to secure most of the southern coast of Anatolia, and sent his vizier Ikhtiyar al-Din to conclude an alliance with Saladin, Nur ad-Din's successor, that same year. Then in 1182, he succeeded in capturing the city of Cotyaeum from the Byzantines. In 1185, he made peace with Emperor Isaac II Angelus, but the next year he transferred power to his eleven sons, who immediately fought each other for control. Despite Kilij Arslan's alliance with Saladin, he promised the armies of the Third Crusade, led by Frederick Barbarossa to freely pass through his territories; however, his sons who were local chieftains disagreed and fought against the Crusaders at the Battle of Philomelion and Battle of Iconium. Following the Crusaders departure, his eldest son Qutb al-Din who led the Turks in the latter battle then fled afterwards, came back to control Konya; hence, Kilij Arslan II escaped and took refuge in Kayseri. Later on, Qutb al-Din declared himself to be the new Sultan, but his father and his brother Kaykhusraw I drove him out of Konya in 1192, then chased him to Aksaray, and besieged the city.

Kilij Arslan II died during the siege of Aksaray in August 1192, aged 77, after promising Kaykhusraw I the succession. Then he was buried in the Alâeddin Kosku in Konya. Kaykhusraw I's brothers continued to fight for control of the other parts of the sultanate.

Children
In 1186, Kilij Arslan II decided to divide the Sultanate among his 11 sons and 3 daughters as follows:
 Qutb al-Din (Sivas, Aksaray)
 Rukn al-Din (Tokat and its surroundings)
 Nur al-Din (Kayseri and its surroundings)
 Muqsed al-Din (Elbistan)
 Muizz al-Din Caesar Shah (Malatya)  
 Muhyiddin Mesut (Ankara, Çankırı, Kastamonu and Eskişehir)
 Kaykhusraw I (Uluborlu, Kutahya)
 Naser al-Din (Niksar, Koyulhisar)
 Nizam al-Din (Amasya)
 Arslanshah (Niğde)
 Sancarshah (Ereğli and its south)
 Fülane Hatun
 Gevher Nesibe Hatun
 Seljuki Khatun, also known as Selçuka Hatun

Notes

References

Sources

1192 deaths
Sultans of Rum
Muslims of the Third Crusade
Year of birth unknown
Seljuk dynasty